Soft-World is a games distributor/developer in Taiwan, based in Taipei, Taiwan. Founded in 1983 and now public, Soft-World currently focuses on MMORPG operation in Taiwan, Hong Kong, Macau, Southeast Asia. It is the largest games software company in Taiwan.

References

External links
 

1983 establishments in Taiwan
Companies based in Taipei
Companies established in 1983
Video game development companies
Video game publishers
Video game companies of Taiwan
Software companies of Taiwan